Richard Cracknell (birth registered second ¼ 1929) is an English former professional rugby league footballer who played in the 1950s.

Background
Dick Cracknell's birth was registered in Huddersfield district, West Riding of Yorkshire, England.

Playing career

International honours
Dick Cracknell won caps for England while at Huddersfield in 1951 against France, in 1952 against Other Nationalities, in 1953 against France, and Wales, while at Oldham in 1953 against France, and won caps for Great Britain while at Huddersfield in 1951 against New Zealand (2 matches).

Dick Cracknell also represented Great Britain in one non-Test match while at Huddersfield in the 12–22 defeat by France at Parc des Princes, Paris on 22 May 1952.

Championship final appearances
Dick Cracknell played , i.e. number 2, in Huddersfield's 2–20 defeat by Wigan in the Championship Final during the 1949–50 season at Maine Road, Manchester on Saturday 13 May 1950.

County Cup Final appearances
About Dick Cracknell's time, there was Oldham's 2–12 defeat by Barrow in the 1954 Lancashire County Cup Final during the 1954–55 season at Station Road, Swinton on Saturday 23 October 1954, the 10–3 victory over St. Helens in the 1956 Lancashire County Cup Final during the 1956–57 season at Station Road, Swinton on Saturday 20 October 1956, and the 12–2 victory over St. Helens in the 1958 Lancashire County Cup Final during the 1958–59 season at Station Road, Swinton on Saturday 25 October 1958, he played , i.e. number 2, in Oldham's 13–8 victory over Wigan in the 1957 Lancashire County Cup Final during the 1957–58 season at Station Road, Swinton on Saturday 19 October 1957.

Genealogical information
Dick Cracknell was the son of the rugby league  for Leeds, Huddersfield and Swinton, and the landlord of The Railway Hotel public house in Lockwood, Huddersfield; x .

References

External links
Statistics at orl-heritagetrust.org.uk
(archived by web.archive.org) Britain hold out Kiwis at Odsal
(archived by archive.is) When League was the new TV game

1929 births
Living people
England national rugby league team players
English rugby league players
Great Britain national rugby league team players
Huddersfield Giants players
Oldham R.L.F.C. players
Rugby league players from Huddersfield
Rugby league wingers